Demen Roumen (born 9 May 1996) is a Dutch football player who plays for RKVV EVV.

Club career
He made his professional debut in the Eerste Divisie for Fortuna Sittard on 1 May 2015 in a game against De Graafschap.

References

External links
 

1996 births
People from Stein, Limburg
Living people
Dutch footballers
Fortuna Sittard players
Eerste Divisie players
Association football defenders
Footballers from Limburg (Netherlands)